Come On, Cowboys is a 1937 American Western "Three Mesquiteers" B-movie directed by Joseph Kane.

Cast 
Robert Livingston as Stony Brooke
Ray Corrigan as Tucson Smith
Max Terhune as Lullaby Joslin
Maxine Doyle as Ellen Reed
Willie Fung as Fong
Edward Peil Jr. as Thomas Rigby
Horace Murphy as Judge Blake
Anne Bennett as Nancy Harris
Ed Cassidy as Jefferson "Jeff" Harris
Roger Williams as Henchman Harry
Fern Emmett as Bus Passenger Mother
Yakima Canutt as Henchman Jake
George Burton as Sheriff
Merrill McCormick as Henchman Dan
Loren Riebe as Henchman Red
Victor Allen as Jim
Al Taylor as Henchman Tim
George Plues as Henchman Mike

References

External links 

1937 films
1937 Western (genre) films
American Western (genre) films
American black-and-white films
Republic Pictures films
Three Mesquiteers films
Films directed by Joseph Kane
Films produced by Sol C. Siegel
1930s English-language films
1930s American films